Amantia was an ancient city and the main settlement of the Amantes, traditionally located in southern Illyria in classical antiquity. In Hellenistic times the city was either part of Illyria or Epirus. In Roman times it was included within Epirus Nova, in the province of Macedonia. The site has been identified with the village of Ploçë, Vlorë County, Albania. Amantia was designated as an archaeological park on 7 April 2003 by the government of Albania.

The massive walls of Amantia were built before the end of the 4th century BC, and literary sources report them as an Illyrian rather than Epirote or Macedonian foundation. Later Amantia acquired the trappings of a Hellenistic town. Amantia received sacred ancient Greek envoys, known as theoroi, around the early 2nd century BC, which only cities that were considered Greek were eligible to receive. The time duration that passed before Illyrian cities were documented on a list of theorodokoi clarifies that acculturation did take place in southern Illyria, however it indicates that the process was gradual.

Amantia occupied an important defensive position above the Aoos/Vjosë river valley to the east, and on the road to the coast and the Bay of Aulon. At the archaeological site of Ploçë, a temple dedicated to Aphrodite, a theatre, and a stadium have also been found.

Etymology 
Pseudo-Skylax (Periplus. 26) and Lycophron (Alexandra. 1043) recorded the toponym Ἀμάντια, Amantia. The Delphic list of theorodokoi reported the form Ἀβάντια, Abantia. The city-ethnic is recorded as Ἀμάντιεύς, Amantieus by Pseudo Skylax (27). The town's demonym was Amantieus.

The name Amantia and the tribal name Amantes have been connected with the Albanian term amë/ãmë ("river-bed, fountain, spring"). It has been suggested that the root morpheme *Amant- was perhaps a "barbarized" version of *Abant- in relation to the Abantes. The name Amantia is generally accepted as Illyrian. The toponym corresponds to Amantia in southern Italy which is linked to the Illyrian movements via the Adriatic (Iapygians) in antiquity.

History 

The earliest of the written sources that recorded the toponym Amantia is the Periplus of Pseudo-Skylax (4th century BC), mentioning it as a city in Illyria. By listing it as the only site between the two poleis of Apollonia and Orikos, the account of Pseudo-Skylax suggests that Amantia was somehow important. It seems that in the Periplus the toponym Amantia denotes the territory rather than the urban center of the polis. It has been suggested that in the Periplus Orikos is identified as a Greek city placed in the territory of Amantia, the latter being regarded as an Illyrian city. Lycophron's Alexandra (3rd century BC) attests Amantia as a polis in the urban sense.

A tradition reported by Pausanias (2nd century AD) alleges that the settlement was founded by Locrians from nearby Thronium and Abantes from Euboea. Stephanus Byzantius – based on Pausanias – mentions that Amantia was founded on Illyrian territory by the Euboean Abantes "returning from the Trojan war". According to another legend reported by Lycophron in his Alexandra, Elpenor – who actually died at Troy – and the Abantes from Euboea went to the island Othronos and were driven by swarms of snakes to the land of the Atintanes towards the city of Amantia. It has been suggested that the data from Pausanias is more in accordance with the settlement of the Euboean colony in Thronion in the coastal site of Triport located in front of the Acroceraunian Mountains northwest of Aulon, not in Amantia in the site of Ploç located south of the Aoos valley in the hinterland of Aulon. Pausanias' data have been compared with the information provided by an Apollonian commemorative monument, suggesting an "oppositional ethnicity" between the Greek colonial associations of the Bay of Aulon (i.e. the area called Abantis), and the barbarians of the hinterland.

Amantia was located on the territory of the Amantes, who were described as an Illyrian people in the Periplus of Pseudo-Scylax (mid. 4th century BCE), as Epirotes by Proxenos (3rd century B.C) and by Hesychius, and as barbarians by Pliny the Elder. It is situated on the slope of a high hill and had only its acropolis fortified. The massive walls of Amantia are considered of Illyrian foundation and are dated to before the end of the 4th century BC.

The city was built around 450 BC on the site of a proto-urban settlement. Already from the beginning it had a fortified acropolis that was surrounded by a 2.1 km long wall, with also a lower town. The original walls made of irregularly slammed limestone were renewed in the 4th century with isodomic ashlar layers. By the 4th century or later, the indigenous site became a town very much organised on a Greek model, acquiring the trappings of a Hellenistic city. It has been suggested that in terms of fortifications, masonry and general architecture, language and religion Amantia shares the same features as the rest of the settlement of the Greek world of that time. But it has been also assumed that like other Illyrian cities Amantia, was not a polis of the Greek type.

The fact that Amantia received theoroi from Delphi during the early 2nd century BC, indicates that it was listed among the Greek cities in the area north of the Acroceraunian mountains. By the 3rd century BC, the town was strengthened economically and minted its own coins.

Following the Roman annexation of the region, the city became part of the Roman province of Macedonia and then Epirus Novus. Throughout the Roman period, Amantia was a civitas libera. Amantia was among the thriving settlements of Epirus during the last two centuries B.C.

Eulalius, one of the Eastern bishops at the Council of Sardica who refused to recognize its right to revoke the condemnation of Athanasius of Alexandria and withdrew in a body to Philippopolis, was probably bishop of this town, but some think he was bishop of Amasea. During the early 4rth century a basilica was erected. No longer a residential bishopric, Amantia is today listed by the Catholic Church as a titular see.

Amantia is an archaeological park of Albania, designed as such on 7 April 2003 by the government of Albania.

Culture 
The culture of the region had a language that is not well known, and it seems to have not had its own writing system. Amantia's urban organization occurred at a period of wider evolution among the settlements of the broader area of Epirus as a result of the previous development among Molossian cities. The onomastics found in the inscriptions of the Hellenistic era in the city are entirely Greek. The local culture readily borrowed iconography and technique from the Greeks. Many cults of Amantia are of the typical Greek pantheon, such as Zeus, Aphrodite, Pandemos and Pan. The cult of Aphrodite probably dates from the archaic era – with Amantia being in such a case among the first settlements in the region to worship the goddess – or from the Hellenistic era along with the cult of Athena. The temple of Aphrodite in Amantia is an example of the Hellenistic influence in present-day Albania via contact with the nearby Greek colonies. The cult of Heracles has been also confirmed in the city. Apollo was also among the prominent deities worshipped in Amantia as in the nearby settlements in Epirus and Illyria.

Other cults like that of the male fertility deity are common of southern Illyria. It seems that the iconographies of this deity were derivations of Egyptian or Italic iconographies (Bes-Silenus), mainly from the Greek colony of Taras, which were widespread in the region from the 4th century BC, but enriched with very stylistic innovations. In the Roman period this deity has undergone transformations mainly of Eastern influence. Some label this deity as the Illyrian god of fertility. In reality, it is futile to approach ancient cults in ethnic or national terms. The South of the Adriatic is clearly a region of religious exchanges, in which facts must be shifted, before considering them to belong to just one culture. The Illyrian-Greek cult of the nymphs was widespread in the region as well as in Amantia. An ancient sanctuary of the eternal fire called Nymphaion was located in an area near Amantia and the Amantes. Amantia's prosperity during the Hellenistic era could explain the bilingualism of the settlement in that period.

On the basis of language, institutions, officials, onomastics, city-planning and fortifications it has been described as a Greek city by historians N.G.L. Hammond (1989), Šašel Kos (1986), Hatzopoulos (1997), Rudolf Haensch (2012), and as a Greek city in southern Illyria, in the territory of the Illyrian tribe of Amantes by Fanula Papazoglou (1986). It has been described as a Hellenized Illyrian city-state by Eckstein (2008), and Lasagni (2019), and as an Illyrian city by Olgita Ceka (2012), and Jaupaj (2019). Winnifrith considered the massive walls of Amantia as of Illyrian rather than Epirote or Macedonian foundation, and that the site later acquired the trappings of a Hellenistic city. Mesihović (2014) has described Amantia as an Illyrian city built and governed according to the Greek model. Papadopoulos (2016) described it as an indigenous site that by the 4th century BC or later developed into a city very much organised on a Greek model. According to Lippert and Matzinger (2021), like other Illyrian cities, Amantia was not a polis of the Greek type.

In the Roman era, the use of Greek by the Romans to address the natives was seen not only as a gesture of good will, but also as an effort to promote rapprochement between those communities. A 2nd century AD bilingual inscription in Greek and Latin dating back to Imperial times is found above the fountain of Ploça village. It shows that the establishment of the Roman province of Macedonia in 148 BC led to the installation of Latin-speaking populations as far as Amantia. The bilingual inscription can also testify that in the ancient site of Ploça there was a Latin enclave and that the city prospered around 200 AD; it could also be the nature of the text that required the use of both languages.

Coinage 

The numismatic material unearthed at Amantia shows that the more numerous coins were of republican Epirote origin, followed by coins with the local legend, which were fewer in number. The territorial proximity to the koinon of the Epirotes explains the predominant role of the coins of this neighbouring state. The symbols that appear on the bronze coins of Amantia are Zeus / thunderbolt, Dione / trident, and Artemis / spearhead, which were taken from Epirus. The community of the Amantes seceded from the Epirote state only at the moment of the fall of the monarchy. At the time of Pyrrhus, his son Alexander II and his descendants, Greater Epirus was still strong and controlled both southern Illyria in the north and part of Acarnania in the south. In this context it is no wonder that the bronze coins of Amantia, starting from 230 BC, used symbols of the Epirote tradition with which the inhabitants of the city were accustomed, and only the legend on the coins was changed from ΑΠΕΙΡΩΤΑΝ (of the Epirotes) to ΑΜΑΝΤΩΝ (of the Amantes), both written in Greek letters.

Institutions 

The organisation of Amantia is quite similar to that of a polis rather than of a federal state.
The local official titles and institutions display typical names of a Greek settlement of that time, such as: prytanis ("the one that presides"), grammateus ("secretary"), toxarchis, agonothetes and the boule.

The town was surrounded with a walled enclosure roughly 2,100m long. A large fort was built with two gates and two defensive towers in the north.

Gallery

See also 

List of settlements in Illyria
Tourism in Albania
Amantes
Abantes

References

Bibliography 

Amantia
Former populated places in Albania
Illyrian Albania
Hellenistic Albania
Archaeology of Illyria
Ancient Greek archaeological sites in Albania
Cities in ancient Illyria
Cities in ancient Epirus
Populated places in ancient Epirus
Tourist attractions in Vlorë County
Buildings and structures in Vlorë County